Diam 24 is a  trimaran sailboat class designed by VPLP and built by Vianney Ancelin that has been used in the Tour de France à la voile.

References

2010s sailboat type designs
Trimarans
Tour de France à la voile